The Clouds Creek, a perennial stream that is part of the Clarence River catchment, is located in the Northern Tablelands region of New South Wales, Australia.

Course and features

See also

 Rivers of New South Wales
 List of rivers of New South Wales (A-K)
 List of rivers of Australia

References

 

Rivers of New South Wales
New England (New South Wales)
Northern Tablelands